Sunanda(സുനന്ദ) (சுனந்தா) is an Indian film playback singer, who predominantly works in Tamil cinema and Malayalam cinema. She completed her pre-degree schooling in Kerala before moving to Chennai in 1983. She was trained in carnatic music. She was introduced to South Indian film music composer Ilaiyaraaja, who offered her the debut playback song for the movie Pudhumai Penn (1984 film).

Career

Prior to her break in Tamil playback singing, she had sung Carnatic songs and slokas for a Malayalam documentary. Her debut film song was a hit, and she went on to sing multiple hit songs in Tamil and Malayalam movies in 1980s and 1990s. She was not able to continue active playback singing for many years due to personal reasons.

List of Tamil songs

References

Living people
Artists from Kerala
Women artists from Kerala
21st-century Indian women artists
Year of birth missing (living people)